The appendix testis (or hydatid of Morgagni) is a vestigial remnant of the Müllerian duct, present on the upper pole of the testis and attached to the tunica vaginalis. It is present about 90% of the time.

Clinical significance

Torsion
The appendix of testis can, occasionally, undergo torsion (i.e. become twisted), causing acute one-sided testicular pain and may require surgical excision to achieve relief. One third of patients present with a palpable "blue dot" discoloration on the scrotum.  This is nearly diagnostic of this condition. If clinical suspicion is high for the serious differential diagnosis of testicular torsion, a surgical exploration of the scrotum is warranted. Torsion of the appendix of testis occurs at ages 0–15 years, with a mean at 10 years, which is similar to that of testicular torsion.

See also
 Paraovarian cyst

References

External links
 
 

Mammal male reproductive system